Roxie Hart (also known as Chicago or Chicago Gal) is a 1942 American comedy film directed by William A. Wellman, and starring Ginger Rogers, Adolphe Menjou and George Montgomery. A film adaptation of a 1926 play Chicago by Maurine Dallas Watkins, a journalist who found inspiration in two real-life Chicago trials (Beulah Annan and Belva Gaertner) she had covered for the press. The play had been adapted once prior, in a 1927 silent film. In 1975, a hit stage musical premiered, and was once more adapted as the Oscar-winning 2002 musical film.

The screenplay by Nunnally Johnson focuses on a Chicago showgirl who confesses to a murder in hopes the publicity will propel her faltering show business career. In the original play, and its other adaptations, Roxie was found guilty but acquitted. However, in order to conform to the Motion Picture Production Code, which regulated moral guidelines for Hollywood films at the time, this incarnation portrays Roxie as innocent but misguided in her attempt to achieve fame.

Plot summary

As soon as Stuart Chapman (Ted North) starts his new job as a newspaper reporter in Chicago, he is pulled into a murder investigation together with his new colleague Homer Howard (George Montgomery). As they sit down in a bar having a drink after a long day, Homer starts telling about a case he reported on in 1927 - a murder case involving the young dancer Roxie Hart (Ginger Rogers).

Back in 1927, a theatre booking agent, Fred Casely, was murdered, and his body was found in Roxie's apartment. Roxie's husband Amos (George Chandler) is immediately questioned by the police, but Roxie is persuaded to let herself get arrested for the murder, since a woman hardly ever gets convicted of murder in Chicago. Besides, the fame she would earn for taking the blame could definitely improve her fading career. Reporter Jake Callahan (Lynne Overman) and Casely's partner E. Clay Benham (Nigel Bruce) reason with Roxie to convince her of what to do.

Roxie takes the blame, even though she knows her husband is guilty of the murder. Her mugshot is taken at the police station. When in jail, Roxie talks to different reporters about the case, including Homer, who has just started out as a journalist. Her husband also gets her the best lawyer money could buy, Billy Flynn (Adolphe Menjou), who is the closest thing to a show artist to ever enter a court room.

Billy decides they will use the fact that Roxie is a weak woman and claim she killed the man in self-defense. Billy sets up a series of interviews with journalist reporters. Roxie is instructed to charm the reporters and perform her trademark dance, "The Black Hula."

Homer is one of these reporters who are charmed by the lovely Roxie. He also finds out that Amos in fact is the real killer from her apartment building janitor, Michael Finnegan, and decides to help Roxie out. When the press turns to report on another "lady criminal", Gertie Baxter (Iris Adrian), and the publicity tide turns in favor of a tougher treatment of women criminals, Roxie pretends to be pregnant to sway the public opinion back to her ring side.

To further create sympathy for Roxie, Billy moves her trial further into the future, and gets Amos to divorce her. Roxie still doesn't trust the legal system enough, and wants Billy to find Finnegan and get him to testify in court on her behalf. It turns out Finnegan is dead, and the written statement he left before he died is judged as inadmissible evidence.

Billy still manages to get Roxie off the hook, and her fainting in front of the jury helps her case tremendously. She is found not guilty of the murder, but Amos is arrested instead, stealing all the publicity from Roxie. Out of the limelight, Roxie has to choose between marrying the poor reporter Homer and a rich member of the jury, stockbroker O'Malley (William Frawley).

In present time 1942, Homer finishes his story and gets up. He addresses the man behind the bar, who is O'Malley, now a former stockbroker because he lost everything in the 1929 stock market crash. A moment later, Homer is picked up from the bar by his wife, Roxie, who arrives in a car with their six children and announces she is pregnant with another.

Cast
 Ginger Rogers as Roxanne "Roxie" Hart 
 Adolphe Menjou as William "Billy" Flynn 
 George Montgomery as Homer Howard 
 Lynne Overman as Jake Callahan 
 Nigel Bruce as E. Clay Benham 
 Phil Silvers as Babe 
 Sara Allgood as Mrs. Morton 
 William Frawley as O'Malley 
 Spring Byington as Mary Sunshine 
 Ted North as Stuart Chapman 
 Helene Reynolds as Velma Wall
 George Chandler as Amos Hart 
 Charles D. Brown as Charles E. Murdock 
 Morris Ankrum as Martin S. Harrison 
 George Lessey as Judge Cannon 
 Iris Adrian as 'Two-Gun' Gertie Baxter
 Milton Parsons as Announcer  
 Frank Darien as Michael Finnegan (uncredited)

Production
Roxie Hart was originally supposed to star Alice Faye but pregnancy prevented her from taking on the role.

Reception
The film received positive notices from critics. On review aggregator website Rotten Tomatoes, it has an 82% score, based on 11 reviews, with an average rating of 7.10/10.

References

External links
 
 
 
 

1942 films
1942 musical comedy films
American crime comedy films
American musical comedy films
1940s English-language films
American black-and-white films
American films based on plays
Films about capital punishment
Films set in Chicago
Films set in the 1920s
20th Century Fox films
Films directed by William A. Wellman
Films with screenplays by Nunnally Johnson
Films with screenplays by Ben Hecht
Films scored by Alfred Newman
1940s American films